"Tell Me!" was the  entry in the Eurovision Song Contest 2000, performed in English by August & Telma. The song is an up-tempo duet, with the singers confessing their love for one another and planning to leave where they are in order to "be together all the time". "Tell Me!" was performed twelfth in the Eurovision Song Contest, following ' Voice with "Nomiza" and preceding 's Serafín Zubiri with "Colgado de un sueño". At the close of voting, it had received 45 points, placing 12th in a field of 24. The song was succeeded as Icelandic representative at the 2001 contest by Two Tricky with "Angel".

In Iceland, record label Skífan released "Tell Me!" as a CD single in 2000 backed with the B-sides "Segðu mér" and "Simple Man" by Örlygur Smári (credited as Öggi), who co-wrote "Tell Me!". The song received copious airplay in Iceland, topping the country's singles chart for two weeks in May 2000. It ended the year as Iceland's fifth-most-successful single.

Icelandic version
The Icelandic version, titled "Hvert sem er" (translated as "Anywhere"), won Söngvakeppnin 2000 with 4318 teveloting votes, over three times more than the runner-up song "Söknuður" performed by Páll Rósinkranz. The Icelandic version was recorded but not released.

Charts

Weekly charts

Year-end charts

References

External links
 Lyrics of the Icelandic version with translation
 Lyrics of the English version

2000 singles
2000 songs
Eurovision songs of Iceland
Eurovision songs of 2000
Number-one singles in Iceland
Male–female vocal duets
Songs written by Örlygur Smári